Waheer, is a small village and one of the 51 Union Councils (administrative subdivisions) of Khushab District in the Punjab Province of Pakistan.

Location 
The village is located on both banks of a canal (Muhajir Branch) at a distance of 18 kilometers from Khushab city.

Population 
The population of Waheer is about 15,000.  Most are farmers, others are in government forces.  It is a major contributor in the armed forces, Pakistan Air Force, irrigation and electronic media.  Youth of the Village takes pride in forming part of the armed forces.
The village is inhabited by the DHUDI and AWAN costs.

Educational facilities 
It has a Government Boys High School with a capacity of 800 Students.  The school is situated in the North West at about 500 meters from the outer fringes of the village.  Owing to the non availability of any academic setup in the nearby villages, Government High School Waheer serves as the only education facility for the boys of these villages and that is why it always remains overcrowded.  Govt. High school Waheer have a computer lab.
In spite of the repeated efforts of the people of Waheer and promises made by the political leaders, village is still denied of any academic facility for the girls.  Consequently, the girls of the village have to travel daily to get education from the nearest Girls High School in Khaliq Abad which is about 5 km from the village.

Achievements 
Despite its poor infrastructure and lack of basic facilities, the village has produced quality people who have excelled in different fields of life, both at home and abroad.  The students completing their studies from Government High School Waheer have competed at all levels and have come through with flying colours.  One of the former student of the School (Mr. Aman Ullah) presently serving as a Lieutenant Colonel in Pak Army, won a gold medal in National level Essay Writing Competition held in 1997.  Major Amir Sultan and Captain Asad Malik are commissioned Officer's in Pakistan Army.  Another student 'Khuda Bakhsh, got a gold medal in MSc Physics from Sargodha University.  Muhammad Aziz Awan is retired as Squadron Leader from Air Force and his son Tariq Aziz Awan is serving in the best regiment of Pakistan army Armour corps "THE GUIDES CAVALRY(FF).  Malik Ahmad Nawaz Awan is serving as SDO in Irrigation Department of Punjab Government.  Malik Khaliq Dad Awan is serving as Deputy Collector in Irrigation Department of Punjab Government.

Another valiant son of Soil, Mian Muhammad Umer (Shaheed) added yet another chapter to the achievements of the village by sacrificing his life while protecting his comrades from a potential suicide bomber in North Waziristan.  Mian Muhammad Umer was posthumously awarded the Medal of Good Conduct Tamgha-e-Basalat for his valour and heroics.

Another son of soil Wing Commander Khurrum Shehzad Akram is serving in Pakistan Air Force as Wing Commander. (Mr. Liaqat raza) presently serving in Pakistan Air force in meteorological dept.  Mr. Imran Zafar Malik is the first person from Waheer to have done Masters in Economics from Government College Lahore & Master's in Business Administration from Institute of Business Administration - Karachi University.

References

Union councils of Khushab District